The following outline is provided as an overview of and topical guide to critical theory:

Critical theory – the examination and critique of society and culture, drawing from knowledge across the social sciences and humanities. The term has two different meanings with different origins and histories: one originating in sociology and the other in literary criticism. This has led to the very literal use of 'critical theory' as an umbrella term to describe any theory founded upon critique. The term "Critical Theory" was first coined by Max Horkheimer in his 1937 essay "Traditional and Critical Theory".

Essence of critical theory 

 Cultural studies –
 Critical theorists –
 Works in critical theory –
 Truth theory –

Branches of critical theory 
 Social theory –
 Literary theory –
 Thing theory –
 Critical theory of technology –
 Critical legal studies –

African-American studies
African-American theory
 Henry Louis Gates Jr. –

Gender studies

Gender studies
 Lauren Berlant –
 Judith Butler –
 Raewyn Connell –
 Susan McClary –
 Laura Mulvey –

Marxist theory

Marxist philosophy
 Frankfurt School –
 Theodor Adorno –
 Herbert Marcuse –
 Walter Benjamin –
 Jürgen Habermas –
 Max Horkheimer –
 Friedrich Pollock –
 Louis Althusser –
 Mikhail Bakhtin –
 Étienne Balibar –
 Ernst Bloch –
 Antonio Gramsci –
 Michael Hardt –
 Fredric Jameson –
 Ernesto Laclau –
 Georg Lukács –
 Chantal Mouffe –
 Antonio Negri –
 Valentin Voloshinov –
 Slavoj Žižek –
 Hegemony –
 Posthegemony –

Postcolonialism

Postcolonialism
 Chinua Achebe –
 "An Image of Africa" –
 Homi Bhabha –
 Double consciousness –

Structuralism

Structuralism
 Roland Barthes –
 Ferdinand de Saussure –
 Claude Lévi-Strauss –
 Louis Althusser –

Post-structuralism

 Roland Barthes –
 Michel Foucault –
 Julia Kristeva –
 Bruno Latour –

Deconstruction

Deconstruction
 Geoffrey Bennington –
 Hélène Cixous –
 Jonathan Culler –
 Jacques Derrida –
 Werner Hamacher –
 Geoffrey Hartman –
 Martin Heidegger –
 Philippe Lacoue-Labarthe –
 Jean-François Lyotard –
 Paul de Man –
 J. Hillis Miller –
 Jean-Luc Nancy –
 Christopher Norris –
 Avital Ronell –
 Gayatri Chakravorty Spivak –

Postmodern Philosophy

Postmodern philosophy
 Jean-François Lyotard –
 Gilles Deleuze –
 Félix Guattari –
 Ernesto Laclau –
 Claude Lefort –
 A Cyborg Manifesto –

Reconstructivism

Reconstructivism
 Paulo Freire –
 John Dewey –

Psychoanalytic theory

Psychoanalytic theory
 Félix Guattari –
 Schizoanalysis –
 Ecosophy –
 Luce Irigaray –
 Teresa de Lauretis –
 Jacques Lacan –
 Julia Kristeva –
 Slavoj Žižek –
 Sigmund Freud –
 The Interpretation of Dreams –
 On Narcissism –
 Totem and Taboo –
 Beyond the Pleasure Principle –
 The Ego and the Id –
 The Future of an Illusion –
 Civilization and Its Discontents –
 Moses and Monotheism –

Queer theory

Queer theory
 Judith Butler –
 Heteronormativity –
 Eve Kosofsky Sedgwick –
 Gloria E. Anzaldúa –
 New Queer Cinema –
 Queer pedagogy –

Semiotics

Semiotics
 Roland Barthes –
 Julia Kristeva –
 Charles Sanders Peirce –
 Ferdinand de Saussure –

Cultural anthropology

Cultural anthropology
 René Girard –

Theories of identity
 Private sphere – certain sector of societal life in which an individual enjoys a degree of authority, unhampered by interventions from governmental or other institutions. Examples of the private sphere are family and home. The complement or opposite of public sphere.
 Public sphere – area in social life where individuals can come together to freely discuss and identify societal problems, and through that discussion influence political action. It is "a discursive space in which individuals and groups congregate to discuss matters of mutual interest and, where possible, to reach a common judgment." 
 Creolization

Linguistical theories of literature
 Mary Louise Pratt –

Major works 

Bloch, Ernst (1938–47). The Principle of Hope
Fromm, Erich (1941). The Fear of Freedom (UK)/Escape from Freedom (US)
Horkheimer, Max; Adorno, Theodor W. (1944–47). Dialectic of Enlightenment
Barthes, Roland (1957). Mythologies
Habermas, Jürgen (1962). The Structural Transformation of the Public Sphere
Marcuse, Herbert (1964). One-Dimensional Man
Adorno, Theodor W. (1966). Negative Dialectics
Derrida, Jacques (1967). Of Grammatology
Derrida, Jacques (1967). Writing and Difference
Habermas, Jürgen (1981). The Theory of Communicative Action

Major theorists

List of critical theorists
 Theodor Adorno –
 Max Horkheimer –
 Louis Althusser –
 Roland Barthes –
 Jean Baudrillard –
 Jacques Lacan –
 Jacques Derrida –
 Erich Fromm –
 Jürgen Habermas –
 Herbert Marcuse –

External links 

 Critical Theory, Stanford Encyclopedia of Philosophy
 "Theory: Death is Not the End", n+1 magazine's short history of academic critical theory. Winter 2005.
 Critical Legal Thinking: A critical legal studies website which uses critical theory in an analysis of law and politics.
 L. Corchia, Jürgen Habermas. A Bibliography: works and studies (1952-2010), Pisa, Edizioni Il Campano – Arnus University Books, 2010, 344 pp.
 
 

Critical theory
Critical theory
 Outline